Pirpainti is a sub township panchayat located in the Bhagalpur district of the Indian state of Bihar.

History
The name in itself is composed of two terms "Pir" and "payat". "Pir" is related to saints while "payat" in local terms means sitting in group for holistic purposes. However, there is a place of 'Pir'  on the bank of river Ganga where people of go to worship. It is the biggest panchayat in Bhagalpur. Patna. Pirpainti consist of 89 Villages and 29 Panchayats. It is located around 232.9 km away from Patna. Pirpainti Vidhan Sabha constituency is one of 243 legislative assemblies of Bihar's legislative assembly. There are 1635 households in Pirpainti. Pirpainti Block is bounded by Mehrma Block towards South, Manihari Block towards East, Kahalgaon Block towards west, Mandro Block towards South.

Transport
Pirpainti railway station is situated on Sahibganj Loop of the Malda railway division.

Population
In Pirpainti village population of children with age 0-6 is 1774 which makes up 19.67% of total population of village. Average Sex Ratio of Pirpainti village is 885 which is lower than Bihar state average of 918. Child Sex Ratio for the Pirpainti as per census is 993, higher than Bihar average of 935. Majority of persons speak Hindi, Bhojpuri and Angika in Pirpainti.

References

Cities and towns in Bhagalpur district